Western Region (Arabic: المنطقة الغربية Al-Minṭaqat al-Ḡarbiyya) was a municipality (mintaqah) of Bahrain in the western part of the country. Its territory is now in the Northern and Southern Governorates.

See also 
 Al Gharbiyah

Former municipalities (regions) of Bahrain